Black Clock was an American literary magazine that published twenty-one issues over twelve years. Edited by Steve Erickson, the magazine was "dedicated to fiction, poetry and creative essays that explore the frontier of constructive anarchy...Black Clock is audacious rather than safe, visceral rather than academic, intellectually engaging rather than antiseptically cerebral, and not above fun. Produced by writers for writers, Black Clock encourages risk and eschews editorial interference."

From its inception in 2004 until its demise in 2016, Black Clock featured work by Don DeLillo, Lydia Davis, David Foster Wallace, Jonathan Lethem, Richard Powers, Joanna Scott, Dana Spiotta, Rick Moody, Maggie Nelson, Greil Marcus, Samuel R. Delany, Miranda July, Geoff Dyer, Brian Evenson, Darcey Steinke, Lynne Tillman, Michael Ventura, Mark Z. Danielewski and William T. Vollmann among others. Work appearing in Black Clock was anthologized in best-of-the-year collections and nominated for O. Henry and Pushcart prizes, and two excerpted novels went on to win National Book Awards.

See also
List of literary magazines

References

External links
 Black Clock
 CalArts Writing

Defunct literary magazines published in the United States
Magazines established in 2004
Biannual magazines published in the United States
Magazines published in California
Magazines disestablished in 2016